Redmondville is an unincorporated community in western Iron County, Missouri, United States. The community is on the west bank of Clayton Creek, just north of that stream's confluence with the Middle Fork of the Black River. It formerly had a school house.

A post office called Redmondville was established in 1904, and remained in operation until 1924. The community has the name of Redmond Black, an early settler.

References

Unincorporated communities in Iron County, Missouri
Unincorporated communities in Missouri